Fairland University (FLU) is a private university in Uganda.

Location
The coordinates of the university campus are:0° 26' 24.00"N, 33° 14' 15.00"E (Latitude:0.440000; Longitude:33.237500)...

History
The university is privately owned by a corporation known as Fairland University Limited. At first housed in a congested residential neighborhood, the university has since shifted to more spacious premises. It has received accreditation from the Uganda National Council for Higher Education, and is ranked among the leading educational institutions in the state of Uganda. The university is non-residential, with students finding accommodation in independent students' hostels, located close to the university campus authority.

s
As of October 2009, the academic courses offered at Fairland University included:

 Bachelor of Arts in Economics (BA.Econ)
 Bachelor of Arts in Business Management (BA.Bus.Mgt)
 Bachelor of Arts in Education (BA.Ed)
 Bachelor of Business Administration (BBA)
 Bachelor of Science with Education (BSc/Ed)
 Bachelor of Science in Mass Communication (BSc.MComm)
 Bachelor of Development Studies (BDS)
 Bachelor of Arts in Guidance & Counseling (BA.G&C)
 Bachelor of Information Technology (BIT)
 Bachelor of Science in Nursing (BSN)
 Bachelor of Arts in Religious Studies (BA.Rel.Std)

In addition to the undergraduate courses, instruction at Certificate and Diploma levels are available in the above disciplines. A limited number of Postgraduate courses are offered at the university.

External links
 Location of Fairland University At Google Maps
 Fairland University Brochure at New Vision
Fairland Graduates Her Fifth Class In November 2010

See also
 Jinja
 Jinja District
 Education in Uganda
 List of universities in Uganda
 List of Business Schools in Uganda
 Ugandan university leaders

References

Universities and colleges in Uganda
Jinja District
Educational institutions established in 2001
2001 establishments in Uganda